Hydromyloidea is a taxonomic superfamily of sea slugs, specifically sea angels, marine opisthobranch gastropod mollusks in the order Gymnosomata.

Taxonomy
There are two families within the superfamily Hydromyloidea:
 Family Hydromylidae
 Family Laginiopsidae

References

Euopisthobranchia